Inayatullah Khan, (20 October 1888 – 12 August 1946) was the King of Afghanistan for three days in January 1929. He was the son of former Afghan Emir, Habibullah Khan. Inayatullah's brief reign ended with his abdication.

In the middle of the night, on 14 January 1929, Amanullah Khan handed over his kingship to his brother Inayatullah Khan and tried to secretly escape from Kabul to Kandahar. Habibullāh Kalakāni and his followers chased Amanullah's Rolls-Royce on horseback but Amanullah managed to escape.

With the King gone, Kalakani wrote a letter to King Inayatullah to either surrender or prepare for war. Inayatullah's response was that he had never sought nor wished to be king and agreed to abdicate and proclaim Kalakani as king on 17 January 1929. Inayatullah was airlifted out of Kabul by the Royal Air Force and spent the remainder of his life in exile. In August 1929, during the Afghan Civil War (1928–1929), there were rumours in Kabul that rupees bearing Inayatullah's name were circulating among anti-Kalakani forces. This led some to believe that Inaytullah had begun to contest the Afghan throne. However, nothing came of this, and the rumours quickly subsided. Inayatullah remained in Iran, until his death in Tehran in 1946.

Family

Inayatullah and Khariya (Khariya, a daughter of Mahmud Tarzi) had Khalilullah Seraj (born 1910), Ruhullah Seraj (born 1911, died 1913), Zaynab Seraj, Mastura Seraj, Humaira Seraj, Hamidullah Enayat Seraj (born c.1923), Roqya Seraj (born 1918), Hamida Seraj (born 1920), Khayrullah Enayat Seraj (born 1921), Esmatullah Enayat Seraj (born 1922), Latifa Seraj (born 1923), Anisa Seraj (born 1924), Nafisa Seraj (born 1925).

References

External links 

 

1888 births
1946 deaths
20th-century Afghan monarchs
Kings of Afghanistan
Barakzai dynasty
Pashtun people
1929 in Afghanistan
20th-century Afghan politicians
Monarchs who abdicated
Afghan expatriates in Iran
Afghan Civil War (1928–1929)